Henry Florian Rasmussen (April 18, 1895, in Chicago, Illinois – January 1, 1949, in Chicago, Illinois) was a pitcher for the Chicago Whales professional baseball team in 1915. In two relief appearances, he allowed 3 runs in 2 innings for a 13.50 earned run average.

External links

1895 births
1949 deaths
American people of Danish descent
Major League Baseball pitchers
Chicago Whales players
Baseball players from Chicago